Cesena is a city and comune in the Emilia-Romagna region of Italy, served by Autostrada A14, and located near the Apennine Mountains, about  from the Adriatic Sea. The total population is 97,137.

History
Cesena was originally an Umbrian or Etruscan town, later known as  Caesena. After a brief spell under Gaulish rule, it was taken over by Romans in the 3rd century BC.  It was a garrison town of strategic importance which was destroyed in the wars between Gaius Marius and Sulla. Pliny mentions the wines of Cesena as among the best.

Cesena was on the border that the Exarchate of Ravenna shared with the Lombards. It was presented to the Papacy by its Frankish conqueror in 754 (Donation of Pepin) and passed back and forth between the popes and the archbishops of Ravenna; it was also briefly a communal republic (1183–1198). It was then long contested between popes and Holy Roman Emperors. The brief rule by the Forlivese Ordelaffi was crushed in 1357 by Papal troops led by Cardinal Gil de Albornoz, after a long siege heroically endured by Cia degli Ordelaffi, wife of the Lord of Forlì.

The little comune revolted again in 1377 during the War of the Eight Saints. This time it was recaptured by Breton troops of Giovanni Acuto (the English-born condottiere John Hawkwood) under the command of Robert, Cardinal of Geneva, (later antipope Clement VII). The latter, acting as the legate of Pope Gregory XI, directed the savage murder of between 2,500 and 5,000 civilians. By the laws of war at the time this was regarded as an atrocity that earned the label of the "Cesena Bloodbath" and the cardinal the "butcher of Cesena". The following year what remained of Cesena was assigned by the new pope Urban VI to Galeotto I Malatesta.

During the period 1379–1465, the city recovered and prospered under the Malatesta, who rebuilt the castle (called Rocca Malatestiana) overlooking the town. The Malatestiana Library, built by near the castle by Malatesta Novello (1429), is considered a fine example of a Renaissance library and holds many valuable manuscripts.

After Novello's death (1465), Cesena returned to the Papal States, but was again seized by a local seignor, Cesare Borgia, in 1500. The city was elevated to capital of his powerful though short-lived duchy.

Cesena subsequently turned into a secondary city of the Papal States. In the 18th and 19th centuries Pope Pius VI and Pope Pius VII were born in the city, which also had Pope Pius VIII as bishop, gaining the title of "city of the three popes". During the Napoleonic Wars it was stripped of numerous monasteries and churches. Some of its citizens had notable roles in the unification of Italy, in the second half of the 19th century.

During World War II Cesena was near the Gothic Line, which ran along the Appennini near the city, and suffered heavily from bombing.

In 1992, it was elevated to the rank of co-capital of province, together with Forlì.

On July 30, 2015, 1000 people gathered at the Parco Ippodromo park in Cesena and performed "Learn to Fly" by the Foo Fighters to convince the band to perform there. The group, later known as the Rockin' 1000, was organized by Foo Fighters fans who played the guitar, bass, and drums in unison to a conductor. Dave Grohl responded with a video where he announced in Italian that the band would visit Cesena and perform there. The show was scheduled for November 3, 2015, at the town's indoor sports arena and concert venue, Carisport, becoming the kickoff date for their European tour.

Main sights
Cesena's monuments include: 
 Abbey of St Maria del Monte
 Malatestian Fortress (Rocca Malatestiana): built by Cardinal Albornoz (from 1380) over a pre-existing edifice which had hosted, among others, Frederick Barbarossa and his grandson Frederick II. It was completed by the Papal governor Lorenzo Zane in 1480, and was used by Cesare Borgia as jail for Caterina Sforza. It is octagonal, with two main towers, the higher maschio and the lower foemina
 Piazza del Popolo
 Biblioteca Malatestiana: first public library in Europe, listed in UNESCO Memory of the World Programme.
 Cathedral of Saint John the Baptist.
 Pinacoteca Comunale: housed in former Benedictine monastery.
 Art collection of Fondazione Cassa di Risparmio di Cesena: housed in the former Celestine monastery.
 Teatro Alessandro Bonci
 Palazzo Ghini.
 Church of Sant'Agostino
Church and Convent dell'Osservanza

Economy
The main economic sectors in Cesena are:
 agriculture, in particular fruit and vegetables, and food processing
 manufacturing, in particular mechanics, agricultural and industrial equipment, construction equipment
 in the tertiary sector, banking and tourism.

Notable companies based in Cesena include:
 Technogym (fitness equipment)
 Soilmec (construction equipment)
 Olidata (computers)
 Cassa di Risparmio di Cesena (banking)

Transport
Cesena railway station, opened in 1861, forms part of the Bologna–Ancona railway.  It is situated at Piazza Giorgio Sanguinetti, to the northeast of the city centre.

Neighbouring comuni
 Mercato Saraceno
 Cesenatico
 Cervia
 Ravenna
 Gambettola
 Montiano
 Longiano
 Roncofreddo
 Meldola
 Bertinoro
 Sarsina

Notable people
 Monty Banks [Mario Bianchi], actor, comedian, director, American and British cinema
 Gregorio Babbi (1708-1768), operatic tenor
 Alessandro Bonci, operatic tenor
 Nicoletta Braschi, Italian actress, best known for her work with her husband, actor and director Roberto Benigni
 Vincenzo Negrini (1804 – 1840), bass-baritone opera singer
 Marco Pantani (1970-2004), road cyclist
 Michael of Cesena (–1342), Minister General of the Franciscans from 1316 to his deposition in 1329
 Pope Pius VI, Pope from February 15, 1775, to August 29, 1799
 Pope Pius VII, Pope from March 14, 1800, to August 20, 1823
 Scipione Chiaramonti, philosopher and opponent of Galileo
 Lorenzo Savadori, Motorcycle racer
 Obadiah ben Jacob Sforno Rabbi
 Alberto Sughi, Italian painter
 Giuseppe Palmas, photographer
 Carlo Domeniconi, guitarist and composer
 Nicky Hayden, Moto GP and Superbike pilot who died in Cesena on the 22nd March 2017
 Maurizio Ferrini, comedian and actor
 Ubaldo Comandini, mayor and cabinet minister

Frazioni
Acquarola, Aie, Bagnile, Borello, Borgo di Ronta, Borgo delle Rose, Borgo Paglia, Botteghino, Budrio, Bulgaria, Bulgarnò, Calisese, Calabrina, Capannaguzzo, Carpineta, Casalbono, Casale, Case Castagnoli, Case Frini, Case Gentili, Case Missiroli, Case Scuola Vecchia, Celincordia, Celletta, Diegaro, Formignano, Gattolino, Gualdo, Il Trebbo, Lizzano, Luogoraro, Luzzena, Macerone, Madonna dell'Olivo, Martorano, Massa, Molino Cento, Monte Aguzzo, Monte Vecchio, Montereale, Monticino, Oriola, Osteria di Piavola, Paderno, Pievesestina, Pioppa, Ponte Abbadesse, Ponte Pietra, Pontecucco, Provezza, Rio Eremo, Rio Marano, Ronta, Roversano, Ruffio, Saiano, San Carlo, San Cristoforo, San Demetrio, San Giorgio, San Mamante, San Martino in Fiume, San Matteo, San Tomaso, San Vittore, Santa Lucia, Sant'Andrea in Bagnolo, Settecrociari, Tessello, Tipano, Torre del Moro, Trebbo, Valdinoce, Villa Calabra, Villa Casone.

See also 
 Roman Catholic Diocese of Cesena-Sarsina
 Palazzo Ghini

References

External links

 Cesena home page 
 Cesena history and info 
 Forlì-Cesena tourism 

 
Cities and towns in Emilia-Romagna
Gothic sites in Emilia-Romagna
Cesena